Zhu Yuling (born 10 January 1995) is a Chinese table tennis player.

Career
She was born in Mianyang in 1995 and played table tennis from the age of 5 as it occupied her when she was ill. At nine years old she and her mother moved so that she could train and she made the provincial team when she was twelve. She made the national team when she was fifteen. In addition to her academic studies she trains 9 hours a day leaving little time for her family.

She is the two-time winner of the World Junior Table Tennis Championships in girls' singles. She was a semi-finalist at the 2013 World Table Tennis Championships.

She was a reserve player at the 2016 Summer Olympics in Rio.

2017 saw Zhu Yuling ascend to the world number one ranking after a thrilling 4–3 win against Liu Shiwen at the ITTF Women's World Cup in Markham, Ontario.

Achievements

Major and Asian tournaments

Singles titles

References

External links

Living people
1995 births
Chinese female table tennis players
Asian Games medalists in table tennis
Table tennis players at the 2014 Asian Games
Table tennis players at the 2018 Asian Games
Asian Games gold medalists for China
Asian Games silver medalists for China
Medalists at the 2014 Asian Games
Medalists at the 2018 Asian Games
People from Mianyang
Table tennis players from Sichuan
People from Zhuhai
Table tennis players from Guangdong
World Table Tennis Championships medalists